Siva Power, Inc. is an American solar power company that developed thin-film technology. The company designed and manufactured copper indium gallium deselenide (CIGS) photovoltaics. Siva Power is based in San Jose, California. Bruce Sohn is CEO and Mark Heising is Chairman.

History
The company was founded in 2006 as Solexant (one of the founders was Paul Alivisatos) and was developing cadmium telluride (CdTe) technology to create solar panels. After the Chinese began dumping silicon solar panels and the American thin-film market worsened, the company decided to pivot and in 2011 hired Brad Mattson to take Solexant in a new direction, which he restarted in 2012. Mattson put the company into stealth mode and ramped up the R&D budget to find a different technology and process for manufacturing solar modules. In 2013 the company reemerged as Siva Power, developing CIGS photovoltaic technology.

As of June 24, 2022 the website is no longer active, and is shown as expiring on August 21, 2021. An article in PV Magazine includes Siva Power as having failed in October 2019.

Technology
Siva Power's deposition technique is Rapid Thermal co-evaporation, which deposits the CIGS compound alloy film by direct reactive condensation of vapors of its constituent elements (copper, indium, gallium, and selenium) onto the substrate, for which Siva Power uses glass. Siva Power has said its initial production capacity of a single line would be 400 megawatts of modules per annum, whereas typical pilot production lines tend to be 5 to 30 megawatts.

Department of Energy SunShot Initiative Award
In 2014, Siva Power won the US Department of Energy SunShot Initiative award under the SunShot SolarMat2 category for driving down the cost of manufacturing and implementing efficiency-increasing technology in manufacturing processes for solar modules. The manufacturing component Siva Power plans to build through the SunShot award are designed to have a 12x higher areal (e.g.: m2/min) manufacturing throughput than other CIGS deposition tools, enabling a fully automated CIGS deposition system at a 3x reduction in capex, labor, and overhead cost.

Team
While in stealth mode, Robert Wendt, former CTO of XsunX and one of the early pioneers of coevaporated CIGS technology, joined as Vice President of Process and Equipment Development. He began Siva’s CIGS program establishing the company's initial CIGS process capability. When Siva Power came out of stealth, it also announced that energy-security expert and former Director of the CIA James Woolsey had joined its board of directors. Shortly after, Siva Power hired Dr. Markus Beck, former Chief Scientist of First Solar and Solyndra, to be Siva Power’s CTO. Dr. Billy J. "BJ" Stanbery, former CEO and founder of HelioVolt, joined Siva Power as President in March 2015. Siva Power announced in May 2015 that Chris McDonald, a factory operations expert from Applied Materials' Solar Business Group and Intel, would become its COO. In 2016, Siva hired Bruce Sohn, former President of First Solar who was instrumental in driving First Solar from startup to billion-dollar company, as its Vice Chairman of the Board. Sohn became CEO in 2017.

Technical Advisory Board
Siva Power has also assembled a technical advisory board composed of Dr. Rommel Noufi, Dr. Charlie Gay, Dr. Markus Beck, John Benner, Dr. Bulent Basol, Scott Thomsen, Dr. BJ Stanbery and Dr. Vivek Lall, all photovoltaic and materials experts. Noufi was the Principal Scientist of the CIGS technology group at the US National Renewable Energy Laboratory (NREL) and is a consulting professor at Stanford University. Gay was the former director of NREL and served as President of Applied Materials Solar Division. Dr. Gay left Siva's advisory board in 2016 when he joined the DOE as Director of the SunShot Program, so as to avoid conflict of interest  Benner is the Executive Director of the Bay Area Photovoltaic Consortium, an industry-led consortium managed by Stanford and UC Berkeley charged with funding next-generation PV research at US universities and national laboratories with funds from both the US DoE and its industry members, and Basol has more than 30 years of experience in photovoltaics, beginning with Monosolar, one of the first solar companies. Scott Thomsen is a glass materials expert who ran Guardian Industries global glass group as the company President, having previously served as the company's Head of North American glass operations and CTO.

Funding and Acquisitions
When the company was Solexant and developing CdTe technology, it had raised $60M over 3 rounds of venture funding from X Seed Capital, Acero Capital (formerly Olympus Capital), Medley Partners, Birchmere Ventures, Trident Capital, Firelake Capital, and DBL Investors. In 2011, Solexant acquired Wakonda, a solar startup based in New York.

The company was recapitalized with $7M in 2015 in series D preferred equity investments from DBL, Medley, Acero and the city of Wuxi, China. In 2016, the company added $5M more to the series D investment. A $25M Series E round, led by Renaissance Technologies hedge fund manager Jim Simons, was closed in May 2017 for the purpose of funding a pilot line.

References

Sustainable energy
Energy companies of the United States